Gazije may refer to:

 Gazije, Bosnia and Herzegovina, a village near Rogatica
 Gazije, Croatia, a village near Feričanci